Valeriu Pleşca (born 8 November 1958) is a Moldovan lawyer and politician. He served as Minister of Defense of Moldova between 29 December 2004 and 11 June 2007.

Notes

External links
 VIP Magazin, VALERIU PLEŞCA. Un civil la apărare
 The official Site of the Ministry of Defense

1958 births
Living people
Moldovan Ministers of Defense
Moldovan economists
Moldovan lawyers